The 93rd New York State Legislature, consisting of the New York State Senate and the New York State Assembly, met from January 4 to April 26, 1870, during the 2nd year term of John T. Hoffman governorship, in Albany.

Background
Under the provisions of the New York Constitution of 1846, 32 Senators and 128 assemblymen were elected in single-seat districts; senators for a two-year term, assemblymen for a one-year term. The senatorial districts were made up of entire counties, except New York County (five districts) and Kings County (two districts). The Assembly districts were made up of entire towns, or city wards, forming a contiguous area, all within the same county.

At this time there were two major political parties: the Republican Party and the Democratic Party.

Elections
The New York state election, 1869 was held on November 3. All nine statewide elective offices up for election were carried by the Democrats. All amendments proposed by the Constitutional Convention, except the re-organization of the judicial system, were rejected by the voters. The approximate party strength at this election, as expressed by the vote for Secretary of State, was: Democrats 331,000 and Republicans 310,000.

Sessions
The Legislature met for the regular session at the Old State Capitol in Albany on January 4, 1870; and adjourned on April 26.

William Hitchman (D) was again elected Speaker with 72 votes against 51 for James W. Husted (R).

On January 17, Henry C. Murphy (D) was elected president pro tempore of the State Senate.

On February 10, the Legislature re-elected Joseph S. Bosworth (D) as a Metropolitan Police Commissioner, for a term of eight years beginning on March 1, 1870.

State Senate

Districts

 1st District: Queens, Richmond and Suffolk counties
 2nd District: 1st, 2nd, 3rd, 4th, 5th, 7th, 11th, 13th, 15th, 19th and 20th wards of the City of Brooklyn
 3rd District: 6th, 8th, 9th, 10th, 12th, 14th, 16th, 17th and 18th wards of the City of Brooklyn; and all towns in Kings County
 4th District: 1st, 2nd, 3rd, 4th, 5th, 6th, 7th, 13th and 14th wards of New York City
 5th District: 8th, 9th, 15th and 16th wards of New York City
 6th District: 10th, 11th and 17th wards of New York City
 7th District: 18th, 20th and 21st wards of New York City
 8th District: 12th, 19th and 22nd wards of New York City
 9th District: Putnam, Rockland and Westchester counties
 10th District: Orange and Sullivan counties
 11th District: Columbia and Dutchess counties
 12th District: Rensselaer and Washington counties
 13th District: Albany County
 14th District: Greene and Ulster counties
 15th District: Fulton, Hamilton, Montgomery, Saratoga and Schenectady counties
 16th District: Clinton, Essex and Warren counties
 17th District: Franklin and St. Lawrence counties
 18th District: Jefferson and Lewis counties
 19th District: Oneida County
 20th District: Herkimer and Otsego counties
 21st District: Madison and Oswego counties
 22nd District: Onondaga and Cortland counties
 23rd District: Chenango, Delaware and Schoharie counties
 24th District: Broome, Tompkins and Tioga counties
 25th District: Cayuga and Wayne counties
 26th District: Ontario, Seneca and Yates counties
 27th District: Chemung, Schuyler and Steuben counties
 28th District: Monroe County
 29th District: Genesee, Niagara and Orleans counties
 30th District: Allegany, Livingston and Wyoming counties
 31st District: Erie County
 32nd District: Cattaraugus and Chautauqua counties

Note: There are now 62 counties in the State of New York. The counties which are not mentioned in this list had not yet been established, or sufficiently organized, the area being included in one or more of the abovementioned counties.

Members
The asterisk (*) denotes members of the previous Legislature who continued in office as members of this Legislature.

Party affiliations follow the vote for Senate Clerk and Police Commissioner.

Employees
 Clerk: Hiram Calkins
 Sergeant-at-Arms: George Graham
 Assistant Sergeant-at-Arms: Abraham J. Meyers
 Doorkeeper: Alexander H. Waterman
 Assistant Doorkeeper: W. W. McKinney
 Assistant Doorkeeper: John Drew
 Assistant Doorkeeper: Orson Root
 Assistant Doorkeeper: Cornelius V. Simpkins
 Stenographer: Andrew Devine, from February 10

State Assembly

Assemblymen
The asterisk (*) denotes members of the previous Legislature who continued as members of this Legislature.

Party affiliations follow the vote for Speaker.

Employees
 Clerk:  Cornelius W. Armstrong
 Sergeant-at-Arms: Jeriah G. Rhoads
 Doorkeeper: James C. Pierce
 First Assistant Doorkeeper: M. W. Wall
 Second Assistant Doorkeeper: Hugh Ryan
 Stenographer: George Wakeman

Notes

Sources
 The New York Civil List compiled by Franklin Benjamin Hough, Stephen C. Hutchins and Edgar Albert Werner (1870; see pg. 439 for Senate districts; pg. 444 for senators; pg. 450–463 for Assembly districts; pg. 512f for assemblymen)
 Journal of the Senate (93rd Session) (1870)
 Journal of the Assembly (93rd Session) (1870; Vol. I)
 Life Sketches of Executive Officers, and Members of the Legislature of the State of New York, Vol. III by H. H. Boone & Theodore P. Cook (1870)

093
1870 in New York (state)
1870 U.S. legislative sessions